Obipteryx is a genus of winter stoneflies in the family Taeniopterygidae. There are at least two described species in Obipteryx.

Species
These two species belong to the genus Obipteryx:
 Obipteryx femoralis Okamoto, 1922
 Obipteryx tenuis (Needham, 1905)

References

Further reading

 
 

Taeniopterygidae